The 1989 British Formula 3000 Championship was the first season of the British Formula 3000 Championship. Australia’s Gary Brabham took the inaugural title, racing an ex-Jean Alesi Reynard-Cosworth 88D for Bromley Motorsport. He took three race wins during the season. Brabham, son of three time World Drivers Champion, Jack Brabham, only raced in the series after a deal to race for Roni Q8 Racing in the International F3000 series fell through. 

Andrew Gilbert-Scott finished second overall for Eddie Jordan Racing, like Brabham, winning three races, in his Reynard-Cosworth 88D. Third spot in the standing went to Roland Ratzenberger, taking victory in round 4, at Donington Park. Other entrants during the season included Damon Hill for CoBRa Motorsports. He drove in two races, finishing third in round 3 at Oulton Park and 6th in round 5, at Brands Hatch, also in a 88D. CoBRa did taste victory in the final round, when Paolo Carcasci won at Oulton Park. Pedro Chaves, who would win the title in 1990, finished 12th in final standing after just one appearance, while former F1 driver, Desiré Wilson made an appearance for GA Motorsport in a Lola T88/50, finishing fourth, in round 5 at Brands Hatch.

Drivers and teams
The following drivers and teams contested the 1989 British Formula 3000 Championship.

Results

British Formula 3000 Championship

Championship Standings

References

Formula 3000
British Formula 3000 Championship